Waterfront is a 1984 Australian miniseries about industrial disputes on the Australian waterfront during the Great Depression.

References

External links
Waterfront Episode 1 at Australian Screen Online
Waterfront Episode 2 at Australian Screen Online

1980s Australian television miniseries
1984 Australian television series debuts
1984 Australian television series endings